The Alma Rišaia Zuṭa ("The Smaller Supreme World" or "The Smaller First World") is a Mandaean religious text. The text is used for Mandaean priestly initiation ceremonies. It is written as a scroll. The Alma Rišaia Zuṭa complements the Alma Rišaia Rba, or "The Greater Supreme World", a related Mandaic text used for priestly rituals.

Manuscripts and translations
An English translation of the text was published by E. S. Drower in 1963, which was based on manuscript 48 of the Drower Collection (abbreviated DC 48). It was copied in 972 A.H. (1564 or 1565 A.D.). Since the first part of the scroll is missing, the content of DC 48 begins in the middle of a dialogue between an initiating priest (rba) and a novice. There are 4 extant parts in the DC 48 manuscript.

MS Rbai Rafid Collection 3F (abbreviated Ms. RRC 3F), copied in 1238 A.H. (1822-1823 A.D.), is a manuscript of Alma Rišaia Zuṭa that was not analyzed by Drower. It was analyzed by Matthew Morgenstern in 2018.  The manuscript is part of the Rbai Rafid Collection (RRC), a private collection of Mandaean manuscripts held by the Mandaean priest Rbai Rafid al-Sabti in Nijmegen, Netherlands.

Prayer sequence

In Alma Rišaia Zuṭa, the prescribed sequence of Qolasta prayers (numbered below according to Drower's 1959 Canonical Prayerbook) to be recited is as follows.

See also
Alma Rišaia
Alma Rišaia Rba
The Coronation of the Great Shishlam
Scroll of Exalted Kingship
The Thousand and Twelve Questions

References

External links
Full text at Archive.org
Alma Rishaia Zuta (Mandaic text from the Mandaean Network)
Alma Rishaia Zuta (Mandaic text from the Mandaean Network)

Mandaean texts